The Fujian Radio Film and TV Group is a state-owned conglomerate consisting of Fujian TV, the Fujian People's Radio Station, and Fujian Film Production.

References

External links
Lyngsat's list of free satellite channels from China
Official Website

Companies with year of establishment missing
Mass media in Fujian
Companies based in Fuzhou
Television networks in China